Ihor Melnyk (born 21 August 1986) is a professional Ukrainian football striker currently playing with Hungaria Vasas in the Ontario Soccer League.

Playing career 
Melnyk is the product of the Lviv Oblast Sportive School System. After graduating from the Lviv Oblast academy he spent time in the Ukrainian Football Amateur League with FC Khimik Novyi Rozdil, and FC Kamenyar-Termoplast Drohobych. In 2006, he signed with FC Karpaty Lviv in the Ukrainian Premier League. Throughout his tenure with Karpaty he primarily saw action in the Ukrainian Second League with FC Karpaty-2 Lviv, and a loan spell with FC Krymteplytsia Molodizhne in 2007.

He would permanently sign with Krymteplytsia in 2007, and play in the Ukrainian First League. He later played with PFC Oleksandria, and FC Lviv, where he won the league title in 2011 with Oleksandria. In 2012, he returned to play with Krymteplytsia, and had a stint with PFC Nyva Ternopil in 2013. In 2015, he played abroad in the Canadian Soccer League with Toronto Atomic FC. Where in his debut season with Toronto he won the CSL Rookie of the Year award. 

In 2017, he played in the Ontario Soccer League with FC Ukraine United's reserve team in the Provincial East division where he was named the Rookie of the Year. In 2018, he returned to the CSL to play with FC Vorkuta. In his debut season with Vorkuta he assisted in securing the CSL Championship in the Second Division, where he contributed a goal. In 2021, he returned to the OSL to play with Hungaria Vasas.

Honors

FC Oleksandria  
 Ukrainian First League: 2010-2011

FC Vorkuta 
 CSL Championship: 2018
 CSL Second Division Championship: 2018

Toronto Atomic FC 
 CSL Rookie of the Year: 2015

References

External links

1986 births
Living people
Ukrainian footballers
FC Krymteplytsia Molodizhne players
FC Bukovyna Chernivtsi players
FC Lviv players
Ukrainian Premier League players
FC Karpaty Lviv players
FC Karpaty-2 Lviv players
FC Oleksandriya players
FC Nyva Ternopil players
Toronto Atomic FC players
FC Ukraine United players
FC Continentals players
Canadian Soccer League (1998–present) players
Ukrainian expatriate footballers
Ukrainian expatriate sportspeople in Canada
Expatriate soccer players in Canada

Association football forwards
Ukrainian First League players
Ukrainian Second League players
Sportspeople from Lviv